Clifton Hotel may refer to:

Clifton Hotel (England)
Clifton Hotel (Canada)